The Next 365 Days is a 2022 Polish erotic drama film directed by Barbara Białowąs and Tomasz Mandes. Serving as a sequel to 365 Days: This Day (2022), it is based on the third novel of a trilogy by Blanka Lipińska, and stars Anna-Maria Sieklucka, Michele Morrone, Simone Susinna, Magdalena Lamparska and Otar Saralidze.

As with its predecessors, the film received negative reviews.

Plot
Massimo visits the grave of his twin brother, Adriano, who was killed during the events of the previous film. He then checks on Laura, who survived and is healing from Adriano's attack. Despite the doctor recommending no intimacy until she has time to heal, the sexually frustrated Laura seduces Massimo during one of his business meetings. Later, when relaxing with her best friend Olga, Laura muses on her miraculous survival and wonders what she should do with her second chance. She then receives a phone call from Nacho, who apologizes for lying to her, and says that he cannot stop thinking about her. Laura rebuffs him, but admits to Olga that, despite being married, she is struggling with her strong attraction to Massimo's rival. 

The friends go to a club to unwind, and Laura later meets up with Massimo, and they have sex after watching a private strip performance. However, Massimo is still troubled by Laura's previous escape with Nacho to a private island, and accuses her of cheating on him; he is also still upset she had not told him about her pregnancy. Laura accuses his family of being the reason that she lost her baby. The next morning, Massimo tries to reconcile with Laura by having sex, but she begins to imagine Nacho instead, and he stops when he realizes that she is distracted. Massimo goes to a kink club with his associates, but does not cheat on Laura.

Upset at the prospect of her marriage falling apart, Laura keeps busy by advancing her career in fashion and being a brand ambassador. She and Olga are invited to the Lagos Fashion Fair, and they travel to Portugal, where Nacho is coincidentally staying for a surfing competition. Laura attempts to avoid him, but cannot stop having intense sexual dreams about him. Eventually, they encounter each other at a club where the fashion show is taking place, and after sharing conversation, Laura kisses him, and they eventually have sex on the beach. Nacho reveals that he saved Massimo's life because he knew Laura loved him, and though he is also in love with her, he will wait for her and not force her to be with him. Laura returns to her hotel, where a furious Massimo confronts her over her behavior. Laura threatens divorce and requests space, and Massimo complies.

Laura returns to Poland to reunite with her parents, and admits she is not sure who she is truly in love with. Her mother observes that it is almost her 30th birthday, which means that it has been almost a year since she first met Massimo, and encourages her daughter to prioritize her own happiness. Laura later dreams of a threesome with herself and the other two men. She gets a call from Olga, who warns her that Massimo knows of her affair with Nacho, and Olga worries that Massimo will murder her. A calm Laura decides that she must return to Sicily to meet Massimo. When she arrives, she realizes that Nacho has posed as her chauffeur. He explains that his feelings for Laura were not love at first sight, but love that grew from friendship, and he implores her to be with him. Laura says that she needs time to think, and Nacho once more agrees to wait.

Laura meets with Massimo on the beach. He is apologetic about his earlier, controlling behavior, and for not being available to support Laura after she lost the baby. When Laura brings up her affair with Nacho, Massimo explains that his father taught him about the value of not forcing love. He asks for her decision about which man she will choose, but Laura does not answer.

Cast
 Anna-Maria Sieklucka as Laura Biel
 Michele Morrone as Don Massimo Torricelli
 Simone Susinna as Nacho
 Magdalena Lamparska as Olga
 Otar Saralidze as Domenico
 Ewa Kasprzyk as Klara Biel
 Dariusz Jakubowski as Tomasz Biel
 Ramón Langa as Don Fernando Matos
 Tomasz Mandes as Tommaso
 Natalia Siwiec as Emily
 Karolina Pisarek as Amelia

Production
Filming was set to begin in 2021, in areas around Italy and Poland, with Anna-Maria Sieklucka and Magdalena Lamparska reprising their roles from the first two films. Michele Morrone was also confirmed to reprising his role.

Release
The Next 365 Days was released on 19 August 2022 on Netflix.

References

External links
 
 

2022 films
2022 multilingual films
2022 romantic drama films
2020s English-language films
2020s erotic drama films
2020s Italian-language films
2020s Polish-language films
English-language Netflix original films
English-language Polish films
Erotic romance films
Film productions suspended due to the COVID-19 pandemic
Films about the Sicilian Mafia
Films based on Polish novels
Films directed by Barbara Białowąs
Films directed by Tomasz Mandes
Films postponed due to the COVID-19 pandemic
Films set in Portugal
Films set in Warsaw
Films shot in Italy
Films shot in Poland
Films with screenplays by Blanka Lipińska
Films with screenplays by Tomasz Mandes
Italian-language Netflix original films
Polish erotic drama films
Polish multilingual films
Polish romantic drama films
Polish-language Netflix original films